The Birthday Party was the first album by The Idle Race, a psychedelic pop band, released in 1968 (see 1968 in music).

This quasi-concept album was the first to be composed almost entirely of songs by a young Birmingham guitarist/singer named Jeff Lynne.  The LP came in a gatefold sleeve. The inside sleeve art included a mock birthday feast attended by many British celebrities, including most of the Radio 1 disc jockeys, the Beatles, the Duke of Windsor, actor Warren Mitchell in his role as Alf Garnett, and group leader Jeff Lynne as an eight-year-old schoolboy. In the U.S. the cover art was different with a rather psychedelic-styled paisley pattern behind the band.

While warmly received by critics, the record failed to chart in the U.K. or the U.S.

The album was re-issued in 1976 by Liberty on their budget-price label Sunset, although in a non-gatefold sleeve with different design, to capitalise on Electric Light Orchestra's success.  A further re-issue came in 2014 by Parlophone, as the Liberty back catalogue had long since been acquired by EMI Records, for Record Store Day, in a limited edition on gold vinyl.

Track listing
All tracks composed by Jeff Lynne; except where indicated
 "Skeleton and the Roundabout" – 2:26
 "Happy Birthday" (Patty Hill, Mildred J. Hill)   – 0:23
 "The Birthday" – 3:00
 "I Like My Toys" – 2:12
 "Morning Sunshine" – 1:48
 "Follow Me, Follow" – 2:48
 "Sitting in My Tree" – 1:59 (mono)
 "On With the Show" – 2:22
 "Lucky Man" – 2:38
 "(Don't Put Your Boys in the Army) Mrs. Ward" – 2:14
 "Pie in the Sky" (Dave Pritchard)   – 2:23
 "The Lady Who Said She Could Fly" – 2:22
 "End of the Road" – 2:09

Personnel
Idle Race
Jeff Lynne - vocals, guitar, piano
Dave Pritchard - guitar, vocals
Greg Masters - bass guitar, vocals
Roger Spencer - drums, vocals

Birthday Party, The
Birthday Party, The
Albums produced by Eddy Offord